Lisa Marie Astle (born 17 May 1973) is a New Zealand former cricketer who played as a right-handed batter. She appeared in a single match for New Zealand, at the 1993 World Cup. She played domestic cricket for Canterbury.

Astle was born in Christchurch. Her only international appearance came at the 1993 World Cup in England, aged 20, when she played against Denmark. She neither batted nor bowled in the match. Astle's brother, Nathan Astle, also played internationally, and she is married to Robbie Frew, who played first-class cricket for Canterbury.

References

External links
 
 

1973 births
Living people
Cricketers from Christchurch
New Zealand women cricketers
New Zealand women One Day International cricketers
Canterbury Magicians cricketers